Joe Pitts (born August 15, 1958) is an American politician serving as Mayor of Clarksville, Tennessee as well as a former Democratic member of the Tennessee House of Representatives representing District 67 since January 2007.

Education
Pitts earned his BS from Austin Peay State University.

Elections
2012 Pitts was unopposed for both the August 2, 2012 Democratic Primary, winning with 781 votes, and won the November 6, 2012 General election with 12,700 votes (97.0%) against write-in candidate Mike Warner.
2006 When District 67 Democratic Representative Kim McMillan left the Legislature and left the seat open, Pitts was unopposed for the August 3, 2006 Democratic Primary, winning with 2,052 votes, and won the November 7, 2006 General election with 6,703 votes (54.0%) against Republican nominee Ken Takasaki.
2008 Pitts was unopposed for both the August 7, 2008 Democratic Primary, winning with 1,837 votes, and the November 4, 2008 General election, winning with 12,525 votes.
2010 Pitts was unopposed for the August 5, 2010 Democratic Primary, winning with 1,746 votes, and was unopposed for the November 2, 2010 General election, winning with 5,387 votes (53.1%) against Republican nominee Neil Revlett.
2018 Pitts was elected mayor of Clarksville, TN, on November 6, 2018, winning over incumbent Kim McMillan with 33.8 percent of the vote over McMillan's 33.2 percent.
 He won re-election in 2022

References

https://www.theleafchronicle.com/story/news/local/clarksville/2018/11/07/clarksville-tn-election-results-2018-consolidation/1825129002/

External links
Official page at the Tennessee General Assembly
Campaign site

Joe Pitts at Ballotpedia
Joe Pitts at the National Institute on Money in State Politics

1958 births
Living people
Austin Peay State University alumni
Democratic Party members of the Tennessee House of Representatives
People from Clarksville, Tennessee
21st-century American politicians